Tri-City Christian School was a PreK-12th grade private Christian school located in Conover, North Carolina, just east of the town of Hickory.

The school opened in 1996, and served the community through providing a Christian education experience for its students. Later after the school opened, it no longer was just a ministry of Tri-City Baptist Church, but invited students from various church backgrounds to attend. In June 2019, the school closed.

TCCS was a member school of the Association of Christian Schools International, the Southern Baptist Association of Christian Schools, and the North Carolina Association of Christian Schools.

References

Christian schools in North Carolina
Private elementary schools in North Carolina
Private high schools in North Carolina
Schools in Catawba County, North Carolina
Private middle schools in North Carolina
Educational institutions established in 1996
Educational institutions disestablished in 2019
1996 establishments in North Carolina